Rhynchocinetes is a genus of shrimp, containing the following 14 species:

Rhynchocinetes albatrossae Chace, 1997
Rhynchocinetes australis Hale, 1941
Rhynchocinetes balssi Gordon, 1936
Rhynchocinetes brucei Okuno, 1994
Rhynchocinetes conspiciocellus Okuno & Takeda, 1992
Rhynchocinetes durbanensis Gordon, 1936
Rhynchocinetes enigma Okuno, 1997
Rhynchocinetes holthuisi Okuno, 1997
Rhynchocinetes ikatere Yaldwyn, 1971
Rhynchocinetes kuiteri Tiefenbacher, 1983
Rhynchocinetes rathbunae Okuno, 1996
Rhynchocinetes serratus (H. Milne-Edwards, 1837)
Rhynchocinetes typus H. Milne-Edwards, 1837 – type species
Rhynchocinetes uritai Kubo, 1942

References

Caridea
Taxa named by Henri Milne-Edwards